Östervärn is a neighbourhood of Malmö, situated in the Borough of Centrum, Malmö Municipality, Skåne County, Sweden.

Östervärn has a railway station of the same name, which serves as a stop on the Malmöringen ring line which local Pågatågen commuter trains operate.

References

Neighbourhoods of Malmö